Sara Gazarek is an American jazz singer from Seattle.

Life and career
Gazarek was born in Seattle, Washington and moved to Los Angeles in 2000 to attend the Thornton School of Music at the University of Southern California. In college her teachers included Carmen Bradford, John Clayton, and Tierney Sutton. Clayton produced her first album, Yours (2005). The album was a critical and commercial success with a top ten ranking in the Billboard Traditional Jazz Charts as well as being the top album download in iTunes for Jazz in Germany and France. Clayton also produced her second album, Return to You (2007). She recorded Where Time Stands Still (2010) with the German band Triosence.

She returned to the University of Southern California to accept a job on the faculty of jazz studies. In the liner notes for Blossom and Bee (2012) she cited the influence of Blossom Dearie.

Awards and honors
 Outstanding Jazz Vocalist Award, Ella Fitzgerald Foundation
 Best Collegiate Vocalist, DownBeat magazine, 2003
Grammy nomination for album Thirsty Ghost, 2019

Discography

As leader
 Yours (Native Language, 2005)
 Live at the Jazz Bakery (Native Language, 2006)
 Return to You (Native Language, 2007)
 Blossom & Bee (Palmetto, 2012)
 Duo with Josh Nelson (Core Port, 2015)
 Dream in the Blue with Josh Nelson (Steel Bird, 2016)
 Thirsty Ghost (2019)
 Vanity (2022)

As guest
 Triosence, Where Time Stands Still (Sony, 2010)

References

External links

 
 

Living people
American women jazz singers
American jazz singers
USC Thornton School of Music alumni
Musicians from Seattle
Place of birth missing (living people)
Singers from Washington (state)
Palmetto Records artists
1982 births
21st-century American singers
21st-century American women singers
Native Language Music artists